Younger is a Scottish convention, style of address, or description traditionally used by the heir apparent to:
A current laird (owner of a substantial and landed estate in Scotland)
Someone whose name includes a territorial designation (i.e. a family who were previously lairds but who are no longer – this applies mainly to armigerous families who had a territorial designation which formed part of their name. Their arms being registered with the inclusion of the territorial designation, having become landless, still retain the full name – including the territorial designation – pertaining to the Grant of Arms)
A Scottish chieftainship (the head of a cadet branch of a clan which has a chief)
A clan chief.
A Scottish Baron.

The style of using the term "Younger" applies equally to a woman who is heir in her own right as to a man. The style of "Younger" is neither a title of nobility nor a peerage and does not carry voting rights either in the Parliament of Scotland or the Kingdom of England. The abbreviation of Younger is Yr. The wife of such an heir may adopt this style also.

When a person bearing this suffix becomes the laird or Baron in their own right or succeeds to the arms of a now landless family or inherits the chieftainship of a cadet branch or the chiefship of the clan, they then drop the suffix and the next heir apparent may add the style to their name.

Forms of address

 The written style of address of the heir to a baron is (for example) "John Smith of Edinburgh, Younger", abbreviated "John Smith of Edinburgh, Yr.", or "John Smith Yr. of Edinburgh".  In the case of the heir to a chief "James Salmond of that Ilk, Yr." or "James Salmond of Salmond, Yr."
 If a female is the heir in her own right, then she is styled in the same way as a male.
 The wife of the heir may adopt the same style as her husband and would be addressed in writing as Mrs. John Smith of Edinburgh, Younger (she might use her own forename but this might imply that she was divorced).
 An heir can also be referred to and addressed as "The Younger (of) [x]", for example "The Younger (of) Edinburgh".
 If a baron has any younger sons they are styled as "Mr. [Forename] [Surname]". The younger son would not have the territorial surname unless he was the nominated heir presumptive.

See also 
 Laird
 Maid (title)
 Prince of Wales
 Forms of address in the United Kingdom
 Courtesy titles in the United Kingdom
 Lord
 Lady
 The Honourable

References 

Scottish society
Scottish titles
Feudalism in Scotland